The United States Space Force (USSF) is the space service branch of the U.S. Armed Forces, one of the eight U.S. uniformed services, and the world's only independent space force. Along with its sister branch, the U.S. Air Force, the Space Force is part of the Department of the Air Force, one of the three civilian-led military departments within the Department of Defense. The Space Force, through the Department of the Air Force, is overseen by the secretary of the Air Force, a civilian political appointee who reports to the secretary of defense, and is appointed by the president with Senate confirmation. The military head of the Space Force is the chief of space operations who is typically the most senior Space Force officer. The chief of space operations exercises supervision over the Space Force's units and serves as one of the Joint Chiefs of Staff.

The Space Force is the smallest U.S. armed service, consisting of 8,600 military personnel. The Space Force operates 77 spacecraft in total across various programs such as GPS, Space Fence, military satellite communications constellations, X-37B spaceplanes, U.S. missile warning system, U.S. space surveillance network, and the Satellite Control Network. Under the Goldwater–Nichols Act, the Space Force is responsible for organizing, training, and equipping space forces, which are then presented to the unified combatant commands, predominantly to United States Space Command, for operational employment.

The U.S. Space Force traces its roots to the beginning of the Cold War, with the first Army Air Forces space programs starting in 1945. In 1954, the Western Development Division, under General Bernard Schriever, was established as the first dedicated space organization within the U.S. Armed Forces and continues to exist as the Space Force's Space and Missile Systems Center. Military space forces were organized under several different Air Force major commands until they were unified when Air Force Space Command was established on 1 September 1982. U.S. space forces first began conducting combat support operations in the Vietnam War and continued to provide satellite communications, weather, and navigation support during the 1982 Falklands War, 1983 United States invasion of Grenada, 1986 United States bombing of Libya, and 1989 United States invasion of Panama. The first major employment of space forces culminated in the Gulf War, where they proved so critical to the U.S.-led coalition that it is sometimes referred to as the first "space war".

The first discussions of creating a military space service occurred in 1958, and it was nearly established in 1982 by President Ronald Reagan as part of the Strategic Defense Initiative, but the idea dissolved with treaty compliance concerns. A 2001 Space Commission argued for the creation of a Space Corps around 2007-2011, but no action was taken by the Obama Administration. On 20 December 2019, the United States Space Force Act was signed into law as part of the National Defense Authorization Act, reorganizing Air Force Space Command and other space elements into the United States Space Force, and creating the first new independent military service since the Army Air Forces were reorganized as the U.S. Air Force in 1947.

Mission
The United States Space Force Act codified the Space Force as organized, trained, and equipped to "provide freedom of operation for the United States in, from, and to space" and "provide prompt and sustained space operations," with its stated duties to "protect the interests of the United States in space, deter aggression in, from, and to space, and conduct space operations."

On 10 August 2020, the Space Force released its capstone doctrine, Spacepower: Doctrine for Space Forces, further expanding on its enumerated missions and duties. In Spacepower, the Space Force defines its three cornerstone responsibilities, which it articulates why spacepower is vital to U.S. prosperity and security, to provide freedom of action in the space domain, enable joint lethality and effectiveness, and provide independent options to U.S. national leadership capable of achieving national objectives. Spacepower establishes the Space Force's five core competencies: space security, combat power projection, space mobility and logistics, information mobility, and space domain awareness. Spacepower lists the seven spacepower disciplines required for the core competencies as orbital warfare, space electromagnetic warfare, space battle management, space access and sustainment, military intelligence, cyber operations, and engineering and acquisitions.

History

Air Force military space program (1945–2019) 

Following the conclusion of World War II in 1945, early military space development was begun within the United States Army Air Forces by General Henry H. Arnold, who identified space as a crucial military arena decades before the first spaceflight. Gaining its independence from the United States Army in 1947, the United States Air Force began development of military space and ballistic missile programs, while also competing with the Army and Navy for the space mission in 1949.

In 1954, the Air Force created its first space organization, the Western Development Division, under the leadership of General Bernard Schriever. The Western Development Division and its successor organization, the Air Force Ballistic Missile Division, were instrumental in developing the first United States military launch vehicles and spacecraft, competing predominantly with the Army Ballistic Missile Agency under the leadership of General John Bruce Medaris and former German scientist Wernher von Braun. The launch of Sputnik 1 spurred a massive reorganization of military space, and the 1958 establishment of the Advanced Research Projects Agency was a short-lived effort to centralized management of military space, with some fearing it would become a military service for space, with authorities being returned to the services in 1959.
 

The establishment of NASA in 1958 eliminated the Army Ballistic Missile Agency, resulting in the Air Force Ballistic Missile Division serving as the primary military space organization. In 1961, the Air Force was designated as the Department of Defense's executive agent for space and Air Research and Development Command was reorganized into Air Force Systems Command, with the Air Force Ballistic Missile Division being replaced by the Space Systems Division - the first Air Force division solely focused on space. In the 1960s, military space activities began to be operationalized, with Aerospace Defense Command taking control of missile warning and space surveillance on behalf of NORAD, Strategic Air Command assuming the weather reconnaissance mission, and Air Force Systems Command operating the first generations of communications satellites on behalf of the Defense Communications Agency. 

In 1967, the Space Systems Division and Ballistic Missiles Division were merged to form the Space and Missile Systems Organization, which began to develop the next generation of satellite communications, space-based missile warning, space launch vehicles and infrastructure, and the predecessor to the Global Positioning System. Space forces saw their first employment in the Vietnam War, providing weather and communications support to ground and air forces. The disjointed nature of military space forces across three military commands resulted in a reevaluation of space force organization within the Air Force. In 1979, the Space and Missile Systems Organization was split, forming the Space Division, and in 1980, Aerospace Defense Command was inactivated and its space forces transferred to Strategic Air Command. Resulting from internal and external pressures, including an effort by a congressman to rename the Air Force into the Aerospace Force and the possibility that President Reagan would direct the creation of a space force as a separate military branch, the Air Force directed the formation of Air Force Space Command in 1982.

During the 1980s, Air Force Space Command absorbed the space missions of Strategic Air Command and the launch mission from Air Force Systems Command. Space forces provided space support during the Falklands War, the United States invasion of Grenada, the 1986 United States bombing of Libya, Operation Earnest Will, and the United States invasion of Panama. The tactical employment of space forces culminated in the Gulf War, where space forces proved so critical to the U.S.-led coalition, that it is sometimes referred to as the first space war.

Following the end of the Gulf War, the Air Force came under intense congressional scrutiny by seeking to artificially merge its air and space operations into a seamless aerospace continuum, without regard for the differences between space and air. During the 1990s, several proposals were put forth for an independent space force, including one by Air Force Space Command lieutenant colonel Cynthia A.S. McKinley in 2000 which called for the establishment of a United States Space Guard. The 2001 Space Commission criticized the Air Force for institutionalizing the primacy of aviation pilots over space officers in Air Force Space Command, for stifling the development of an independent space culture, and not paying sufficient budgetary attention to space. The Space Commission recommended the formation of a Space Corps within the Air Force between 2007 and 2011, with an independent Space Force to be created at a later date. The September 11 attacks derailed most progress in space development, resulting in the inactivation of United States Space Command and beginning a period of atrophy in military space. The only major change to occur was the transfer of the Space and Missile Systems Center from Air Force Materiel Command to Air Force Space Command. Following the inactivation of U.S. Space Command in 2002, Russia and China began developing sophisticated on-orbit capabilities and an array of counter-space weapons, with the 2007 Chinese anti-satellite missile test of particular concern as it created 2,841 high-velocity debris items, a larger amount of dangerous space junk than any other space event in history. The Allard Commission report, unveiled in the wake of the 2007 Chinese anti-satellite missile test, called for a reorganization of national security space, however many of its recommendations were not acted upon by the Air Force.

Growing impatient with the Air Force, who they felt was more interested in jet fighters than space, representatives Jim Cooper and Mike Rogers unveiled a bipartisan proposal in the House of Representatives to establish the United States Space Corps as a separate military service within the Department of the Air Force, with the commandant of the Space Corps as a member of the Joint Chiefs of Staff. This proposal was put forward to separate space professionals from the Air Force, give space a greater cultural focus, and help develop a leaner and faster space acquisitions system. This was done because of congressional concern that the space mission had become subordinate to the Air Force's preferred air dominance mission and that space officers were being treated unfairly within the Air Force, with Representative Rogers noting that in 2016 none of the 37 Air Force colonels selected for promotion to brigadier general were space officers and that only 2 of the 450 hours of Air Force professional military education were dedicated to space. The proposal passed in the House of Representatives but was cut from the final bill in negotiations with the U.S. Senate. Following the defeat of the proposal, representatives Cooper and Rogers heavily criticized Air Force leadership for not taking threats in space seriously and continued resistance to reform. The Space Corps proposal was, in large part, spurred on by the development of the People's Liberation Army Strategic Support Force and the Russian Space Forces.

Independent Space Force (2019–present) 

The Space Corps proposal gained new life when, at a June 2018 meeting of the National Space Council, President Donald Trump directed the Department of Defense to begin the necessary processes to establish the U.S. Space Force as a branch of the Armed Forces. On 19 February 2019, Space Policy Directive 4 was signed, initially calling for the placement of the U.S. Space Force within the Department of the Air Force, later creating and transferring the service to the Department of the Space Force. Legislative provisions for the Space Force were included in the 2020 National Defense Authorization Act, which was signed into law on 20 December 2019. The Space Force was established as the sixth armed service branch, with Air Force general John "Jay" Raymond, the commander of Air Force Space Command and U.S. Space Command, becoming the first chief of space operations. On 14 January 2020, Raymond was officially sworn in as chief of space operations by Vice President Mike Pence.

On 20 December, its first organizational change occurred when Secretary of the Air Force Barbara Barrett designated Air Force Space Command's Fourteenth Air Force as Space Operations Command. All of Air Force Space Command's 16,000 active duty and civilian personnel were assigned to the new service. Major organizational changes during the first year included replacing its space wings and operations groups with deltas and garrisons on 24 July 2020 and announcing its field command structure, merging wings and groups into deltas and numbered air forces and major commands into field commands. Space Delta 2 became the space domain awareness delta, replacing the 21st Operations Group; Space Delta 3 became the space electronic warfare delta, replacing the 721st Operations Group; Space Delta 4 became the missile warning delta, replacing 460th Operations Group and absorbing the ground-based missile warning radars of the 21st Operations Group; Space Delta 5 became the command and control delta, replacing the 614th Air Operations Center; Space Delta 6 became the cyberspace operations delta, replacing the 50th Network Operations Group; Space Delta 7 became the intelligence, surveillance, and reconnaissance delta, replacing Air Combat Command's 544th Intelligence, Surveillance and Reconnaissance Group; Space Delta 8 became the satellite communication and navigation warfare delta, replacing the 50th Operations Group; Space Delta 9 became the orbital warfare delta, replacing the 750th Operations Group; the Peterson-Schriever Garrison became responsible for the base administration of Peterson Air Force Base, Schriever Air Force Base, Cheyenne Mountain Air Force Station, Thule Air Base, New Boston Air Force Station, and Kaena Point Satellite Tracking Station, replacing the 21st Space Wing and the 50th Space Wing; the Buckley Garrison became responsible for the base administration of Buckley Air Force Base, Cape Cod Air Force Station, Cavalier Air Force Station, and Clear Air Force Station, replacing the 460th Space Wing.

On 21 October 2020, Space Operations Command was established as its first field command, replacing headquarters Air Force Space Command. The first Space Operations Command (redesignated Fourteenth Air Force) was redesignated back to Fourteenth Air Force, inactivated on 21 October 2020 and return to the United States Air Force. On the same day, a newly created Space Operations Command-West, was activated. 
On 3 April 2020, Chief Master Sergeant Roger A. Towberman, formerly command chief of Air Force Space Command, transferred to the Space Force as the Senior Enlisted Advisor of the Space Force, becoming its second member and first enlisted member. On 18 April 2020, 86 graduates of the United States Air Force Academy became the first group of commissioned second lieutenants in the U.S. Space Force. On 16 July 2020, the Space Force selected 2,410 space operations officers and enlisted space systems operators to transfer to the Space Force, with the first back recommissioning or reenlisting on 1 September. The Space Force swore in its first 7 enlisted recruits on 20 October 2020, graduating basic military training on 10 December 2020 and its first Officer Training School candidates commissioned on 16 October. The Space Force also commissioned its first astronaut, with Colonel Michael S. Hopkins, the commander of SpaceX Crew-1, swearing into the Space Force from the International Space Station on 18 December 2020.

During the first year major symbols were also unveiled, with the Seal of the United States Space Force approved on 15 January 2020 and was revealed on 24 January 2020, the flag of the United States Space Force debuted at a signing ceremony for the 2020 Armed Forces Day proclamation on 15 May 2020, the Space Force Delta symbol and motto of Semper Supra released on 22 July 2020, and the official service title of Guardian announced on 18 December 2020. The first Air Force installations were renamed on 9 December 2020, with Patrick Air Force Base and Cape Canaveral Air Force Station renamed as Patrick Space Force Base and Cape Canaveral Space Force Station.

In September 2020, the Space Force and NASA signed a memorandum of understanding formally acknowledging the joint role of both agencies. This new memorandum replaced a similar document signed in 2006 between NASA and Air Force Space Command. The Space Force's first combat operations as a new service included providing early warning of Iranian Islamic Revolutionary Guard Corps Aerospace Force missile strikes against U.S. troops at Al Asad Airbase on 7 January 2020 through the 2nd Space Warning Squadron's Space Based Infrared System. The Space Force also monitored Russian Space Forces spacecraft which had been tailing U.S. government satellites.

On 20 September 2022, the Space Force unveiled its official anthem, the march "Semper Supra" ("Always Above"), in a performance by the United States Air Force Band during the 2022 Air & Space Forces Association Air, Space and Cyber Conference at National Harbor, Maryland.

Structure 

The United States Space Force is organized and managed under the civilian-led Department of the Air Force, which also manages the United States Air Force. The Department of the Air Force is under the leadership of the secretary of the Air Force (SecAF) and under secretary of the Air Force, both civilian political appointees. The most senior Space Force officer is the chief of space operations (CSO), unless a Space Force general is serving as the chairman or vice-chairman of the Joint Chiefs of Staff. The secretary of the Air Force and chief of space operations are responsible for organizing, recruiting, training, and equipping the space forces for employment by the unified combat commands, predominantly United States Space Command.

The Space Force's field organizations consist of three different echelons of command: field commands, deltas or garrisons, and squadrons. Field commands align with specific mission focuses and are led by a lieutenant general or major general. Deltas and garrisons are organized around a specific function, such as operations or training, in the case of a delta, or installation support, in the case of a garrison, and are led by a colonel. Squadrons are focused on specific tactics and are led by a lieutenant colonel.

Space Staff
The Space Staff, also known as the Office of the Chief of Space Operations or Headquarters, which serves as the service's highest staff and headquarters element, is located at the Pentagon.

Chief of space operations
The Space Staff is overseen by the chief of space operations (CSO), who holds the four-star rank of General and is responsible for organizing, training, and equipping the Space Force and serves as the principal advisor to the Secretary of the Air Force on the Space Force. In addition to a service role, the CSO serves on the Joint Chiefs of Staff (JCS), providing advice to the President and Secretary of Defense

Vice chief of space operations
The vice chief of space operations (VCSO), also holding the rank of General, serves as the Deputy to the Chief of Space Operations and is responsible for overseeing, integrating space policy and guidance, and coordinating space-related activities for the U.S. Space Force and Department of the Air Force.

Chief Master Sergeant of the Space Force
The Chief Master Sergeant of the Space Force (CMSSF) is the most senior enlisted member of the Space Force unless an enlisted guardian is serving as the senior enlisted advisor to the chairman. The CMSSF provides direction for and represents the interests of the Space Force's enlisted corps, while also acting as a personal advisor to the (CSO) and (SecAF) on issues relating to the welfare, readiness, morale, utilization, and development of members of the Space Force.

Director of staff
Support to the Space Staff is managed by the director of staff, who holds the rank of Lieutenant General and is responsible for the staff action, protocol, information technology and administration, resources, and total force integration groups. The Director of Staff is also responsible for synchronizing policy, plans, positions, procedures, and cross-functional issues for the U.S. Space Force headquarters staff.

Chief human capital officer
Parallel to the director of staff are three deputy chiefs of space operations. The deputy chief of space operations for personnel and logistics, also known as the chief human capital officer, leads the S1/4 staff directorate and is a civilian member of the Senior Executive Service.

Chief operations officer
The Deputy Chief of Space Operations for operations, cyber, and nuclear, also known as the chief operations officer (COO), leads the S2/3/6/10 staff directorate and is a lieutenant general, responsible for Space Force operations, intelligence, sustainment, cyber, and nuclear operations support.

Chief strategy resourcing officer
The deputy chief of space operations for strategy, plans, programs, requirements, and analysis, also known as the chief strategy and resourcing officer, leads the S5/8/9 staff directorate and is a lieutenant general, responsible for Space Force strategies, requirements, and budget.

Chief technology and innovation officer
The chief technology and innovation officer is a civilian member of the Senior Executive Service.

List of staff

Space Operations Command 
Space Operations Command (SpOC) is the United States Space Force's first field command and is commanded by a lieutenant general. The current commanding officer is Lt Gen Stephen N. Whiting. SpOC was established on 21 October 2020 by redesignating Headquarters United States Space Force, which had been redesignated from Headquarters Air Force Space Command on 20 December 2019 when the Space Force was established. SpOC is primarily responsible for space operations, cyber operations, intelligence operations, and the administration of SpOC bases, and serves as the Space Force service component to United States Space Command. It is responsible for eight space mission deltas and two garrisons.

SpOC West is responsible for executing space warfighting operations and is led by a major general who is also the deputy commander of SpOC and the commander of U.S. Space Command's Combined Force Space Component Command, for which SpOC West serves as the headquarters. The current commanding officer is Maj Gen Douglas Schiess. SpOC West was redesignated from the original Space Operations Command upon the current Space Operations Command's standup on 21 October 2020. This first SpOC had been redesignated from Air Force Space Command's Fourteenth Air Force on 20 December 2020.

Space Systems Command 
The Space Systems Command (SSC) is the Space Force's field command for acquisitions, engineering, research and development, and launch activities, commanded by a lieutenant general. The current commander is Lt Gen Michael Guetlein. The SSC is the oldest Department of Defense space organization, established on 1 July 1954 as Air Research and Development Command's Western Development Division under General Bernard Schriever. It went through a number of iterations, being redesignated as the Air Force Ballistic Missile Division in 1957, Air Force Systems Command's Space Systems Division in 1961, the Space and Missile Systems Organization in 1967, the Space Division in 1979, Space Systems Division in 1990, Space and Missile Systems Center under Air Force Materiel Command in 1992, before being transferred to Air Force Space Command in 2001, and finally Space Systems Command as of 13 August 2021. SSC is responsible for two space launch deltas, six directorates, 1 division, 1 garrison, and approximately 11,000 guardians. Insignia of Space Systems Command are trimmed in gold to distinguish them from Space Operations Command, and symbolize the perfection required of space launch activities. SSC has also received command of Air Force Life Cycle Management Center's Strategic Warning and Surveillance Systems Division.

Space Training and Readiness Command 
Space Training and Readiness Command (STARCOM) is the third and final major field command of the Space Force, with a primary role of developing distinct space training, education, test and evaluation, and doctrine development for the force. It was activated 23 August 2021, it is commanded by Brigadier General Shawn N. Bratton, Air National Guard (AGR). Subordinate deltas are each commanded by a Colonel, and are comprised of individual squadrons. As of 2021, STARCOM commands five space operations deltas. All sleeve insignia of STARCOM units is trimmed in Cannes Blue.

United States Space Forces Indo-Pacific 
The United States Space Forces Indo-Pacific is a United States Space Force component field command to the United States Indo-Pacific Command. It plans, coordinates, supports, and conducts employment of space operations across the full range of military operations, including security cooperation, in support of U.S. Indo-Pacific Command objectives. It was activated on 22 November 2022 in an activation ceremony at Joint Base Pearl Harbor–Hickam, Hawai'i.

United States Space Forces Central 
The United States Space Forces Central is a United States Space Force component field command to the United States Central Command, headquartered at MacDill Air Force Base. It plans, coordinates, supports, and conducts employment of space operations across the full range of military operations, including security cooperation, in support of U.S. Central Command objectives. It was activated on 2 December 2022 in an activation ceremony at MacDill Air Force Base.

Direct reporting units 
Direct reporting units report directly to the chief of space operations, rather than having an intervening chain of command for communication to travel between.

Reserve components 
Unlike the other branches of the United States Armed Forces, the United States Space Force does not currently include reserve components. A federal reserve of the United States Space Force is slated to begin in 2021, while a Space National Guard component is being debated.

Locations
The Space Force operates six primary bases, seven smaller stations, and one air base in Greenland. On 9 December 2020, Patrick Air Force Base and Cape Canaveral Air Force Station in Florida were the first Space Force installations renamed, becoming Patrick Space Force Base and Cape Canaveral Space Force Station. Over the next seven months the remaining facilities were renamed. The service also has ten units based outside the contiguous United States in Greenland, the United Kingdom, Ascension Island, Diego Garcia atoll, Alaska, Hawaii, and Guam. During the transition from Air Force control, only one facility renaming has gone beyond replacing the "Air Force base" suffix, the former Kaena Point Satellite Tracking Station in Hawaii, which was simplified to Kaena Point Space Force Station. One facility has yet to be renamed, Los Angeles Air Force Base, which is already under Space Force administrative control.

Partnerships with other organizations

United States Space Command

United States Space Command (USSPACECOM) is the unified combatant command for all military space operations, while the Space Force is the military service responsible for organizing, training, and equipping the majority of forces for U.S. Space Command. The Space Force's service component to Space Command is Space Operations Command, providing the majority of space forces. U.S. Space Command also consists of smaller amounts of forces from the United States Army, United States Marine Corps, United States Navy, and United States Air Force. This mirrors the relationship between the Space Force's predecessor, Air Force Space Command, and U.S. Space Command (and between 2002 and 2019, United States Strategic Command).

United States Air Force
The United States Space Force and the United States Air Force are both coequal sister service branches under the United States Department of the Air Force, a civilian-led military department under the Department of Defense. The Space Force's direct antecedent, Air Force Space Command, was an Air Force major command, and Air Force space professionals worked throughout Air Education and Training Command, Air Combat Command, Air Force Materiel Command and the rest of the Air Force's major commands. Prior to the creation of Air Force Space Command in 1982, Air Force space assets were spread across Air Force Systems Command for launch and acquisitions, Aerospace Defense Command (until its inactivation in 1979), and Strategic Air Command. The predecessor of the Space Force, the Western Development Division, was established in 1954 under the Air Force's Air Research and Development Command.

The Space Force derives most of its support personnel from the Air Force, being provided civil engineers, security forces, logistics, contracting, finance, and medical personnel who are then assigned to Space Force garrisons. The Space Force and Air Force also share the same service secretary and military department, along with common commissioning sources and training programs such as the United States Air Force Academy, Air University, and Air Force Basic Military Training. The Air Force Research Laboratory and Air Force Office of Scientific Research (AFOSR) also conduct research to benefit the Space Force, as well as the Air Force.

National Reconnaissance Office
The National Reconnaissance Office (NRO) is a Department of Defense agency and a member of the United States Intelligence Community, responsible for designing, building, launching, and maintaining intelligence satellites. The National Reconnaissance Office was established in 1961 as a joint agency between the United States Department of Defense and Central Intelligence Agency, declassified and acknowledged in 1992. The Space Force performs NRO space launches and consists of 40% of the agency's personnel. Proposals have been put forward, including by the Air Force Association and retired Air Force lieutenant general David Deptula, to merge the NRO into the Space Force, transforming it into a Space Force Intelligence, Reconnaissance, and Surveillance Command and consolidating the entire national security space apparatus in the Space Force.

The USSF's Space Systems Command (SSC), in partnership with the National Reconnaissance Office, manages the National Security Space Launch (NSSL) program, which uses government and contract spacecraft to launch sensitive government payloads. NSSL supports both the USSF and NRO, as well as the Navy. NRO director Scolese has characterized his agency as critical to American space dominance and the Space Force, stating that NRO provides “unrivaled situational awareness and intelligence to the best imagery and signals data on the planet.” Additionally, in August 2021, former NRO deputy director Lt. Gen. Michael Guetlein became commander of Space Systems Command. Parts of the NRO will be integrated into the Space Force, their delta shaped insignia will be trimmed in black.

National Aeronautics and Space Administration

The National Aeronautics and Space Administration (NASA) is an independent agency of the United States government responsible for civil spaceflight. NASA and the Space Force's predecessors in the Air Force have a long-standing cooperative relationship, with the Space Force supporting NASA launches out of Kennedy Space Center, to include range support and rescue operations from Task Force 45. NASA and the Space Force also partner on matters such as space domain awareness and planetary defense operations. Space Force members can be NASA astronauts, with Colonel Michael S. Hopkins, the commander of SpaceX Crew-1, commissioned into the Space Force from the International Space Station on 18 December 2020.

Spacecraft

As of mid-2019, in reference to actual satellites in orbit being operated and controlled by the then-AFSPC, the Air Force reported that there were four Advanced Extremely High Frequency communications; one Space Tracking and Surveillance System-Advanced Technology Risk Reduction (ATRR, USA-205); five Defense Meteorological Satellite Program; six Defense Satellite Communications System satellites; five Defense Support Program; 31 Global Positioning System satellites; four GSSAP; five Milstar communications; seven Space-Based Infrared System (SBIRS, infra-red, launch warning); two SBSS; and seven WGS.

The Space Force operates two Boeing X-37B spaceplanes on behalf of the Department of the Air Force Rapid Capabilities Office, which were previously managed by Air Force Space Command for five spaceflights. USA-299, launched in May 2020, was the first spaceplane mission operated under Space Force command.

Personnel
On 20 December 2019, all members of the former Air Force Space Command were assigned to the United States Space Force. Members of the United States Army, United States Navy, United States Marine Corps, and United States Air Force were also detailed to the Space Force. 16,000 military and civilian individuals in total were assigned to the Space Force at its creation. Air Force space airmen began transferring to the Space Force in FY 2020, while Army space soldiers, Navy space sailors, and space marines will begin transferring in fiscal year 2022 (1 October 2021–30 September 2022).

The Space Force is creating career tracks for Space Force Core Organic specialties, including space-specific operations, intelligence, engineering, acquisitions, science, and cyber/communications. Support specialties, such as legal, medical, civil engineering, logistics, financial management, security forces, and public affairs will be detailed by the Air Force to support the Space Force. Space Force service members are known as guardians. The title of guardian has a long history in space operations, tracing its heritage to Air Force Space Command's 1983 motto, Guardians of the High Frontier. It was announced to commemorate the Space Force's first birthday by Vice President Mike Pence on 18 December 2020. Following the creation of the Space Force, they were referred to as space professionals on an interim basis until a final name was selected.

Rank structure

Officer corps

On 18 April 2020, the United States Air Force Academy graduated the Space Force's first 86 new second lieutenants. Space Force officers are commissioned through the United States Air Force Academy, Air Force Reserve Officer Training Corps programs at civilian universities, and Air Force Officer Training School. The Air Force Academy is considered the premier commissioning route for Space Force officers, having a Space Force detachment which provides Space Force training, immersion, and mentorship to cadets. The Department of Astronautics was established in 1958, and the Cadet Space Operations Squadron was established in 1997.

Space Force officers attend Air University at Maxwell Air Force Base for professional military education, which has space-specific programs including the Space Gray Rhinos program at Squadron Officer School for captains; the Schriever Space Scholars program at Air Command and Staff College for majors; and the West Space Seminar at Air War College for lieutenant colonels and colonels.
 A small number of Space Force and Air Force officers attend the School of Advanced Air and Space Studies.

Space Force officers specialties include:
 13S - Space operations officer
 13SA - Orbital warfare officer
 13SB - Space electronic warfare officer
 13SD - Space battle management officer
 13SE - Space access and sustainment officer
 14N - Intelligence officer
 17 - Cyberspace warfare operations officer
 17C - Cyberspace warfare operations commander
 17D - Warfighter communications operations officer
 17S - Cyberspace effects operations officer
 62 - Developmental engineer field
 62E - Developmental engineer
 62S - Materiel leader
 63 - Acquisition field
 63A - Acquisitions manager
 63G - Senior materiel leader-lower echelon
 63S - Materiel leader

Enlisted corps

The Space Force swore in its first seven enlisted recruits on 20 October 2020, graduating basic military training on 10 December 2020. The Space Force conducts its basic training through Air Force Basic Military Training at Lackland Air Force Base, San Antonio, Texas, training alongside Air Force recruits, with the inclusion of space-specific curriculum. The Space Force's Forrest L. Vosler Non-Commissioned Officer Academy, operating under Space Training and Readiness Delta (Provisional), at Peterson Space Force Base, Colorado, provides enlisted professional military education for Space Force technical sergeants. The Space Force is in the process of standing up a separate enlisted professional military education program and enlisted professional military education center with a curriculum focused on Space Force doctrine, values, and competencies at the specific ranks of specialist 4, technical sergeant, senior master sergeant, and chief master sergeant.

Space Force enlisted specialties include:
 1C6 - Space systems operations specialist 
 1N - Intelligence specialist
 1N0 - All source intelligence analyst
 1N1 - Geospatial intelligence analyst
 1N2 - Signals intelligence analyst
 1N4 - Fusion analyst
 1N8 - Targeting analyst
 3D - Cyberspace support specialist
 3D0 - Cyberspace operations specialist
 3D1 - Cyberspace support specialist

Uniforms

The Space Force is in the process of implementing its own mess dress, service dress, and physical training uniforms, but in the interim period, it has adopted those of the Air Force. Space Force cadets at the Air Force Academy wear the same uniform as Air Force cadets; however, in their distinctive blue and white parade dress uniforms they wear a platinum sash in place of the gold sash worn by Air Force cadets.

The mess dress uniform is worn during official formal evening functions and state occasions and consists of a blue mess dress coat, blue trousers with a  satin blue trouser stripe, white dress shirt, with a satin blue cummerbund and bow tie. Rank is worn on blue shoulder boards for officers and on the sleeves for enlisted. Officers wear a  silver braid on the sleeve, while general officers wear a  silver braid. Miniature medals and badges are worn in mess dress. As of 24 May 2022, the mess dress uniform is optional for all personnel until a Space Force version of the uniform is available.

The interim service dress uniform, also known as the "class A" uniform, consists of a blue three-button coat, matching trousers worn with a blue belt with silver buckle, a light blue long or short-sleeved collared shirt with two chest pockets and shoulder loops, and blue tie. The service dress coat is worn with a silver name tag, ribbons, silver "U.S." collar insignia, U.S. Space Force lapel insignia, and full-sized badges. Metal officer rank is worn on the epaulets, while the enlisted rank patch is worn on the sleeve. Officers wear a  blue braid on the sleeve, while general officers wear  blue braid. Authorized headwear includes the service cap with a silver Great Seal of the United States on the front, or a blue flight cap. Field grade and general officer service caps include additional clouds and darts on the cap visor, while the chief of space operations is authorized a ring of clouds and darts around the service cap.

The interim service blue uniform, also known as the "class B" uniform, is the service dress uniform worn without the coat and with the tie optional. The service blue uniform is worn with a blue plastic name tag and badges. Officer rank is worn on blue slip-on shoulder marks, while enlisted rank is sewn on the sleeve. Authorized outerwear includes the lightweight blue jacket, topcoat, and all-weather coat.

On 24 May 2022, the Space Force modified the interim uniforms by incorporating some elements of the final service dress uniform. Enlisted Guardians are now permitted to wear Space Force rank insignia as opposed to Air Force insignia, and the enlisted uniform's "U.S." lapel pins can now include a hexagon that surrounds the text. Additionally, both enlisted and officers can now wear the final uniform's hexagonal nametags and replace all Air Force-style buttons with Space Force versions. Finally, all Air Force-style cap badges can also be replaced with their Space Force counterpart, with different designs for enlisted and officers. All of these modifications are optional and are subject to availability of the new elements.

The Space Force has adopted the Operational Camouflage Pattern (OCP) uniform as its combat uniform, sharing it with the U.S. Army and U.S. Air Force. The Space Force is distinguished by the use of embroidered space blue thread for the name tape, service tape, rank insignia (except for major and second lieutenant, which use spice brown), and badges, and wears a full color United States flag on the left sleeve. The U.S. Space Force, field command, delta, school or other headquarters patch is worn on the left sleeve, while the unit of assignment patch is worn on the right sleeve. The Extended Cold Weather Clothing System (ECWCS) is authorized with wear with the OCP uniform. The Space Force has also authorized the wear of the legacy digital tigerstripe pattern Airman Battle Uniform (ABU) until its phase-out in April 2021. The Space Force stated that adopting the OCP uniform will save the costs of designing and producing an entirely new one, and that Space Force troops deploy on the ground alongside Army, Marine Corps, Navy, and Air Force personnel.

Badges, awards, and decorations

Members of the Space Force wear occupational badges on their uniforms to indicate job specialty. They may also wear previously earned badges, occupational badges, or badges awarded by sister services. Space Force occupational badges are the Space Operations Badge, for 13S space operations officers and 1C6 enlisted space systems specialists, the Intelligence Badge, for 14N intelligence officers and 1N enlisted intelligence specialists, the Cyberspace Operator Badge for 17X cyberspace operations officers and the Cyberspace Support Badge for enlisted 3DX cyberspace support specialists, and the Acquisition and Financial Management Badge for 62X developmental engineer officers and 63X acquisitions manager officers.

As part of the United States Department of the Air Force, the United States Space Force and United States Air Force share the same awards and decorations or same variations of awards and decorations.

Budget 

The 2021 Department of Defense Budget requests $1.6 billion for three National Security Space Launch vehicles. Of this budget $1.05 billion will fund three launches: AFSPC-36, AFSPC-87 and AFSPC-112. The United States Space Force is reported to be working closely with commercial leaders in the space domain, such as Elon Musk (SpaceX) and Jeff Bezos (Blue Origin), to determine their capability in serving the mission. According to Lt. General David Thompson, the United States Space Force is already in contracting talks with Blue Origin. The budget includes $560 million to upgrade the launch systems of Blue Origin, Northrop Grumman, and United Launch Alliance. Further, the 2021 budget requests $1.8 billion for two Lockheed Martin Global Positioning System (GPS) III systems and other projects to fulfill the Space Superiority Strategy. The GPS III system, first launched on 23 December 2018, is the latest GPS system from contractor Lockheed Martin; the GPS III system has improved anti-jamming capabilities and is three times more accurate than current GPS systems. The FY 2021 Budget also includes $2.5 billion allocated to the Next-Generation Overhead Persistent Infrared (Next-Gen OPIR) satellite constellation as part of a DOD-wide increase on missile defense capacity to defend from threats such as North Korea. The Next-Gen OPIR constellation will provide the U.S. military with a resilient worldwide missile warning system. This new generation of satellites will work in tandem with the existing Space Based Overhead Persistent Infrared System (SBIRS); production of the SBIRS will conclude in 2022 and the first Next-Gen OPIR satellite is expected to be delivered in 2025. The FY2023 budget request includes $1,000,000,000 dollars from the US Air Forces MILPERS budget that was transferred to the Space Force.

Reception 

The Space Force had mixed reception within policy think tanks. The Center for Strategic and International Studies supported the creation of the new service, arguing that it was needed to consolidate national security space responsibilities, which in 2016 was spread out across 60 different organizations. They also argued that the Space Force was needed to develop space strategy and doctrine, and ensure space agencies are not overlooked. The Heritage Foundation also supported the creation of the Space Force, citing the existence of anti-satellite threats from China and Russia and the creation of the Russian Aerospace Forces and reorganization of the Russian Space Forces, and the Chinese People's Liberation Army Strategic Support Force in 2015. The Project on Government Oversight opposed the creation of a space force, arguing that centralizing military assets resulted in more duplication and led to inter-service tension. The United States Department of Defense estimated that establishing Space Force would cost $13 billion over 5 years. The Cato Institute argued the creation of a Space Force was premature because of uncertainty about its military and international impacts.

The idea of a space force was popular with supporters of former President Donald Trump, and Trump's presidential campaign sold unofficial space force merchandise – a practice he has been criticized for. The creation of Space Force resulted in some jokes, memes, and controversies online. Late night talk show hosts such as Jimmy Kimmel and Stephen Colbert joked about the idea. A Netflix comedy show, Space Force, has a plot involving the establishment of a United States Space Force. The Space Force was accused of being a "vanity project" for President Trump, despite the concept being debated since the 1990s as a means to counter Chinese and Russian military threats in space. Trump claimed in 2018 to have created the idea of the Space Force, saying "nobody even thought about the Space Force" before him, while in reality it was first proposed by representatives Jim Cooper and Mike Rogers in 2017. After President Joe Biden took office in January 2021, White House Press Secretary Jen Psaki confirmed that the Biden administration would not re-evaluate the decision to establish the Space Force.

Logos, uniforms, and word choices used by the Space Force resulted in comparisons to science fiction franchises, and sometimes criticism, on social media. The delta on its seal and emblem was compared to the Starfleet symbol from Star Trek, and naming their personnel "guardians" resulted in comparisons to the Marvel film Guardians of the Galaxy. The Space Force responded the delta symbol has a long history of use by military space forces that predates Star Trek, and that the title "guardian" was derived from Air Force Space Command's 1983 motto "Guardians of the High Frontier."

Following the departure of Donald Trump from the presidency and the confirmation of the Space Force's establishment by the Biden administration, less critical and more analytical coverage of the Space Force has arisen. High-ranking military officers and commentators interviewed by Politico in a February 2021 article agreed that President Trump's influence and image were in part the cause for the negative reception of the Space Force, and that improving its public image would take time. In another February 2021 article in The Conversation, Wendy Whitman Cobb, an Air University professor, blamed the generally derisive and inaccurate public perception of the Space Force on the influence of science fiction and pop culture, claiming that "modern pop culture depictions of the Space Force as a joke are distracting from the serious responsibilities the USSF is taking on." Intelligencer has described the Space Force in a November 2021 article as "Trump's most misunderstood creation," also attributing the negative reception of the Space Force on the impact of military science fiction on American culture, as well as on the public image of Donald Trump at the time of its creation, and the subsequent appropriation and politicization of the idea of a Space Force by President Trump and his supporters. In May 2022, the American Homefront Project, a collaboration of public media stations that reports on military and veteran affairs, released a story consulting several Space Force cadets and officers which clarified the role of the Space Force and emphasized its importance as a branch.

See also
 Strategic Defense Initiative
 Militarization of space
 Space Development Agency
 Women in the United States Space Force
 Space Force Association

References

External links

 
Space warfare
Military space program of the United States
Military units and formations established in 2019
2019 establishments in the United States
Uniformed services of the United States
United States Armed Forces service branches
Space units and formations of the United States